Marquess Wu of Wei (died 370 BCE), was a ruler of the State of Wei during the Warring States period of ancient China. Born Wèi Jī, he was the son of the former ruler Marquess Wen of Wei. He became ruler in 395 BCE upon the death of his father. Marquess Wu of Wei died in 370 BCE and was succeeded by his son King Hui of Wei.

References 
 Sima Qian, "Records of the Grand Historian"
 Yang Chang, "History of the Warring States", Taiwan Commercial Press, 1997

Zhou dynasty people
370 BC deaths
Year of birth unknown
Monarchs of Wei (state)
4th-century BC Chinese monarchs